Salvia karwinskii (Karwinski's sage) is a perennial shrub native to the moist mountain forests of Mexico, Guatemala, Honduras, El Salvador, and Nicaragua, typically growing in or near pine or oak forests at  elevation. It is known as a honey-producing plant in those areas, but is rarely seen in private gardens. Specimens are grown at Strybing Arboretum, Huntington Botanical Gardens, and University of California Botanical Garden.

The 1 in flowers are inflated and have two lips, ranging in color from brick-red, rose-red, to scarlet, and are carried on many 15 in racemes. The stems and petioles of the leaves have short wooly hairs, making them appear gray. The  rough leaves are evergreen, with veining on the underside and light cream-colored hairs.

Notes

karwinskii
Flora of El Salvador
Flora of Guatemala
Flora of Honduras
Flora of Mexico
Flora of Nicaragua